Ernest John Revell (15 April 1934 - 15 December 2017) was a Scottish scholar, professor emeritus and chair of the Department of Near and Middle Eastern Civilization at the University of Toronto, and expert in the field of Biblical Hebrew. He remained active, publishing until 2016.

Life 
Revell was a watercolorist and a botanical artist.

Education 
In 1962, Revel earned his PhD at the University of Toronto, with his thesis A structural analysis of the grammar of the Manual of discipline (1QS).

Teaching 
He served the University of Toronto as a professor, chair and professor emeritus in the Department of Near Eastern Studies which later became the Department of Near and Middle Eastern Civilizations. Revell was a member of Society of Biblical Literature.

Bibliography

Thesis

Books

Articles

References 

1934 births
2017 deaths
Academic staff of the University of Toronto
University of Toronto alumni
British Hebraists
Scottish emigrants to Canada